Frances M. Goodwin (1855–1929) was an American sculptor born in Newcastle, Indiana. Goodwin began her studies in Indianapolis, briefly studying at the Indiana Art Association, and then at the Chicago Art Institute where she studied with Lorado Taft and then at the Art Students League under Daniel Chester French.

Her statue representing "Education" was exhibited at the 1893 Columbian Exposition, in the Indiana State Building.

She died in Newcastle, Indiana, the town in which she was born, in 1929.

Selected works 

 Bust of Vice President Schuyler Colfax, marble,  (ca. 1897) United States Capitol, District of Columbia
 Bust of Benjamin Parker, Henry County Historical Society, New Castle, Indiana
 Robert Dale Owen, Indiana State House, Indianapolis, Indiana, (1911) The bust disappeared in the 1970s
 Eve, created with Robert William Davidson, Indiana University-Purdue University at Indianapolis, Indianapolis, Indiana, first exhibited at the 1933 Chicago World's Fair
 bust of Captain Everett, Riverhead Cemetery, New York

References

1855 births
1929 deaths
19th-century American sculptors
19th-century American women artists
20th-century American sculptors
20th-century American women artists
American women sculptors
School of the Art Institute of Chicago alumni